Cristhyan Noto Souza (born 21 May 2000), simply known as Cristhyan, is a Brazilian footballer who plays as a forward.

Career statistics

References

External links
Atlético Goianiense official profile 

2000 births
Living people
Sportspeople from Goiás
Brazilian footballers
Association football forwards
Campeonato Brasileiro Série B players
Atlético Clube Goianiense players